(15 August 1854 – 12 September 1925) was a Japanese-born American landscape designer responsible for the maintenance and expansion of the Japanese Tea Garden at Golden Gate Park in San Francisco, California, from 1895 until his death in 1925. Hagiwara is often credited with the invention of the fortune cookie in California.

Biography 
Hagiwara was born on 15 August 1854 in a village in northern Kai Province (located in present-day Yamanashi, Yamanashi Prefecture) into a peasant family. His father died when he was 15 years-old and ran the family farm until he emigrated to the United States in 1878. He opened the first Japanese restaurant in San Francisco, and records show that he was the owner of a restaurant called Yamatoya in Chinatown. Hagiwara opened another restaurant in nearby Oakland but this venture failed.

After the close of San Francisco's 1894 World's Fair, Hagiwara was then hired to manage the fair's tea garden site. He personally oversaw the modification of the temporary Japanese Village fair exhibit to the permanent Japanese Tea Garden and was official caretaker of the garden for most of the time between 1895 to his death in 1925.  It was there that he is said to have introduced the modern version of the fortune cookie, which he is believed to have adapted from Japan's

References

External links
A brief history of the Japanese Tea Garden, Golden Gate Park, San Francisco, CA USA, An account by Erik Sumiharu Hagiwara-Nagata. 1999.
A Brief History of The Fortune Cookie, An account by Erik Sumiharu Hagiwara-Nagata, 2008
Makoto Hagiwara and San Francisco's Japanese Tea Garden  John Tambis, Pacific Horticulture Magazine,vol. 45,number 1 Spring 1984

Japanese gardeners
American gardeners
American landscape and garden designers
California people in design
1854 births
1925 deaths
Japanese emigrants to the United States
People from Yamanashi Prefecture
Golden Gate Park
American designers